Murakumo: Renegade Mech Pursuit is a third-person shooter developed by FromSoftware and published by Ubisoft. It is FromSoftware's first game for the Xbox.

Story
In the year 2090, a new energy source is invented and a city is constructed to focus on the further development of this energy called Oliver Port. In response, a company called LugnalCorp utilizes this energy source for the development of conscious mecha known as ARKS (Artificial Reflexive Keneticoid). Due to the high industrial demand for the ARKs, LugnalCorp rushes the ARKs into production; after a while of operation, the ARKs rebel against their human operators and start their rebellion over Oliver Port. A team of fighter pilots is assembled to combat the renegade ARKs under the name of Murakumo.

Reception

The game received "generally unfavorable reviews" according to the review aggregation website Metacritic. GameSpot's Giancarlo Varanini described it as "one of the worst games to come out for the Xbox this year". In Japan, Famitsu gave it a score of 29 out of 40.

References

External links
 

2002 video games
FromSoftware games
Video games about mecha
Ubisoft games
Video games developed in Japan
Video games scored by Keiichiro Segawa
Xbox games
Xbox-only games